"The Heat (Musica Fiesta)" is the 41st single by Japanese entertainer Akina Nakamori. Written by Adya and Uru, the single was released on May 2, 2002, by Universal Music Japan under the Kitty MME label. It was also the second single from her 20th studio album Resonancia.

Background 
"The Heat (Musica Fiesta)" was Nakamori's first release under Universal Music Japan and it coincided with the 20th anniversary of her career. It was also considered to be a homecoming, as MCA Victor, which was her label from 1993 to 1997, was merged with UMJ in May 2000. The song was recorded at Be Born Studio in Nerima and Sangmind Studio in Seoul, with Korean hip-hop group X-Large providing the rap vocals. It was used as the ending theme song of the TBS drama series . The music video was shot in Tokyo and Spain.

Chart performance 
"The Heat (Musica Fiesta)" peaked at No. 20 on Oricon's weekly singles chart and sold over 14,700 copies, becoming Nakamori's first top-20 single since "Kisei (Never Forget)" in 1998.

Track listing

Charts

References

External links 
 
 
 

2002 singles
2002 songs
Akina Nakamori songs
Japanese-language songs
Japanese television drama theme songs
Universal Music Japan singles